Choristella nofronii is a species of sea snail, a marine gastropod mollusk in the family Choristellidae.

Description
The shell grows to a size of 3 mm.

Distribution
This species occurs in the Northern Atlantic Ocean; off Spain and Portugal; in the Mediterranean Sea.

References

 Gofas, S.; Le Renard, J.; Bouchet, P. (2001). Mollusca, in: Costello, M.J. et al. (Ed.) (2001). European register of marine species: a check-list of the marine species in Europe and a bibliography of guides to their identification. Collection Patrimoines Naturels, 50: pp. 180–213 (look up in IMIS) [details]
 McLean J.H. (1992). Systematic review of the family Choristellidae (Archeogastropoda: Lepetellacea) with descriptions of new species. The Veliger 35(4): 273–294

External links
 

Choristellidae
Gastropods described in 1992